Lucretia Mott (née Coffin; January 3, 1793 – November 11, 1880) was an American Quaker, abolitionist, women's rights activist, and social reformer. She had formed the idea of reforming the position of women in society when she was amongst the women excluded from the World Anti-Slavery Convention held in London in 1840. In 1848, she was invited by Jane Hunt to a meeting that led to the first public gathering about women's rights, the Seneca Falls Convention, during which Mott co-wrote the Declaration of Sentiments.

Her speaking abilities made her an important abolitionist, feminist, and reformer; she had been a Quaker preacher early in her adulthood. When the United States outlawed slavery in 1865, she advocated giving former slaves, both male and female, the right to vote (suffrage). She remained a central figure in reform movements until her death in 1880. The area around her long-time residence in Cheltenham Township is now known as La Mott, in her honor.

Early life and education 
Lucretia Coffin was born January 3, 1793, in Nantucket, Massachusetts, the second child of Anna Folger and Thomas Coffin. Through her mother, she was a descendant of Peter Folger and Mary Morrell Folger, early settlers of the colony. Her cousin was Benjamin Franklin, one of the Framers of the Constitution, while other Folger relatives were Tories, those who remained loyal to the British Crown during the American Revolution.

She was sent at the age of 13 to the Nine Partners School, located in Dutchess County, New York, which was run by the Society of Friends (Quakers). There she became a teacher after graduation. Her interest in women's rights began when she discovered that male teachers at the school were paid significantly more than female staff. After her family moved to Philadelphia, she and James Mott, another teacher at Nine Partners, followed.

Abolitionist

Early anti-slavery efforts 
Like most Quakers, Mott considered slavery to be evil. Inspired in part by minister Elias Hicks, she and other Quakers refused to use cotton cloth, cane sugar, and other slavery-produced goods. In 1821, Mott became a Quaker minister. With her husband's support, she traveled extensively as a minister, and her sermons emphasized the Quaker inward light or the presence of the Divine within every individual. Her sermons also included her free produce and anti-slavery sentiments. In 1833, her husband helped found the American Anti-Slavery Society.

By then an experienced minister and abolitionist, Lucretia Mott was the only woman to speak at the organizational meeting in Philadelphia. She tested the language of the society's Constitution and bolstered support when many delegates were precarious. Days after the conclusion of the convention, at the urging of other delegates, Mott and other white and black women founded the Philadelphia Female Anti-Slavery Society. Integrated from its founding, the organization opposed both slavery and racism, and developed close ties to Philadelphia's Black community. Mott herself often preached at Black parishes. Around this time, Mott's sister-in-law, Abigail Lydia Mott, and brother-in-law, Lindley Murray Moore, were helping to found the Rochester Anti-Slavery Society (see Julia Griffiths).

Amidst social persecution by abolition opponents and pain from dyspepsia, Mott continued her work for the abolitionist cause. She managed their household budget to extend hospitality to guests, including fugitive slaves, and donated to charities. Mott was praised for her ability to maintain her household while contributing to the cause. In the words of one editor, "She is proof that it is possible for a woman to widen her sphere without deserting it."

Mott and other female activists also organized anti-slavery fairs to raise awareness and revenue, providing much of the funding for the movement.

Women's participation in the anti-slavery movement threatened societal norms. Many members of the abolitionist movement opposed public activities by women, especially public speaking. At the Congregational Church General Assembly, delegates agreed on a pastoral letter warning women that lecturing directly defied St. Paul's instruction for women to keep quiet in church.(1 Timothy 2:12) Other people opposed women's speaking to mixed crowds of men and women, which they called "promiscuous." Others were uncertain about what was proper, as the rising popularity of the Grimké sisters and other women speakers attracted support for abolition.

Mott attended all three national Anti-Slavery Conventions of American Women (1837, 1838, 1839). During the 1838 convention in Philadelphia, a mob destroyed Pennsylvania Hall, a newly opened meeting place built by abolitionists. Mott and the white and black women delegates linked arms to exit the building safely through the crowd. Afterward, the mob targeted her home and Black institutions and neighborhoods in Philadelphia. As a friend redirected the mob, Mott waited in her parlor, willing to face her violent opponents.

Mott was involved in a number of anti-slavery organizations, including the Philadelphia Female Anti-Slavery Society, the Pennsylvania Anti-Slavery Society (founded in 1838), the American Free Produce Association, and the American Anti-Slavery Society.

World's Anti-Slavery Convention 

In June 1840, Mott attended the General Anti-Slavery Convention, better known as the World's Anti-Slavery Convention, in London, England. In spite of Mott's status as one of six women delegates, before the conference began, the men voted to exclude the American women from participating, and the female delegates were required to sit in a segregated area. Anti-slavery leaders did not want the women's rights issue to become associated with the cause of ending slavery worldwide and dilute the focus on abolition. In addition, the social mores of the time denied women's full participation in public political life. Several of the American men attending the convention, including William Lloyd Garrison and Wendell Phillips, protested the women's exclusion. Garrison, Nathaniel Peabody Rogers, William Adam, and African American activist Charles Lenox Remond sat with the women in the segregated area.

Activists Elizabeth Cady Stanton and her husband Henry Brewster Stanton attended the convention while on their honeymoon. Stanton admired Mott, and the two women became united as friends and allies.

One Irish reporter deemed her the "Lioness of the Convention". Mott was among the women included in the commemorative painting of the convention, which also featured female British activists: Elizabeth Pease, Mary Anne Rawson, Anne Knight, Elizabeth Tredgold and Mary Clarkson, daughter of Thomas Clarkson. Benjamin Haydon the painting's creator had intended to give Mott a prominent place in the painting. However during a sitting on June 29, 1840, to capture her likeness, he took a dislike to her views and decided to not use her portrait prominently.

Encouraged by active debates in England and Scotland, Mott also returned with new energy for the anti-slavery cause in the United States. She and her husband allowed their Philadelphia-area home, called Roadside, in the district now known as La Mott, to be used as a stop on the Underground Railroad. She continued an active public lecture schedule, with destinations including the major Northern cities of New York City and Boston, as well as travel over several weeks to slave-owning states, with speeches in Baltimore, Maryland and other cities in Virginia. She arranged to meet with slave owners to discuss the morality of slavery. In the District of Columbia, Mott timed her lecture to coincide with the return of Congress from Christmas recess; more than 40 Congressmen attended. She had a personal audience with President John Tyler who, impressed with her speech, said, "I would like to hand Mr. Calhoun over to you", referring to the senator and abolition opponent.

Women's rights

Overview 

Mott and Cady Stanton became well acquainted at the World's Anti-Slavery Convention. Cady Stanton later recalled that they first discussed the possibility of a women's rights convention in London.

Women's rights activists advocated a range of issues, including equality in marriage, such as women's property rights and rights to their earnings. At that time, it was very difficult to obtain divorce, and fathers were almost always granted custody of children. Cady Stanton sought to make divorce easier to obtain and to safeguard women's access to and control of their children. Though some early feminists disagreed, and viewed Cady Stanton's proposal as scandalous, Mott stated "her great faith in Elizabeth Stanton's quick instinct & clear insight in all appertaining to women's rights."

Mott's theology was influenced by Unitarians including Theodore Parker and William Ellery Channing as well as early Quakers including William Penn. She thought that "the kingdom of God is within man" (1749) and was part of the group of religious liberals who formed the Free Religious Association in 1867, with Rabbi Isaac Mayer Wise, Ralph Waldo Emerson and Thomas Wentworth Higginson.

In 1866, Mott joined with Stanton, Anthony, and Stone to establish the American Equal Rights Association. The following year, the organization became active in Kansas where black suffrage and woman suffrage were to be decided by popular vote, and it was then that Stanton and Anthony formed a political alliance with Train, leading to Mott's resignation. Kansas failed to pass both referendums.

Mott was a founder and president of the Northern Association for the Relief and Employment of Poor Women in Philadelphia (founded in 1846).

Seneca Falls Convention 

In 1848, Mott and Cady Stanton organized the Seneca Falls Convention, the first women's rights convention, at Seneca Falls, New York. Stanton's resolution that it was "the duty of the women of this country to secure to themselves the sacred right to the elective franchise" was passed despite Mott's opposition. Mott viewed politics as corrupted by slavery and moral compromises, but she soon concluded that women's "right to the elective franchise however, is the same, and should be yielded to her, whether she exercises that right or not." Mott signed the Seneca Falls Declaration of Sentiments.

Despite Mott's opposition to electoral politics, her fame had reached into the political arena even before the July 1848 women's rights convention. During the June 1848 National Convention of the Liberty Party, 5 of the 84 voting delegates cast their ballots for Lucretia Mott to be their party's candidate for the Office of U.S. Vice President. In delegate voting, she placed 4th in a field of nine.

Over the next few decades, women's suffrage became the focus of the women's rights movement. While Cady Stanton is usually credited as the leader of that effort, it was Mott's mentoring of Cady Stanton and their work together that inspired the event. Mott's sister, Martha Coffin Wright, also helped organize the convention and signed the declaration.

Noted abolitionist and human rights activist Frederick Douglass was in attendance and played a key role in persuading the other attendees to agree to a resolution calling for women's suffrage.

Sermon to the Medical Students 
The biological justifications of race as a biologically provable basis for difference gave rise to the stigma of innate, naturally determined inferiority in the 19th century. In 1849, Mott's "Sermon to the Medical Students" was published:

"May you be faithful, and enter into a consideration as to how far you are partakers in this evil, even in other men's sins. How far, by permission, by apology, or otherwise, you are found lending your sanction to a system which degrades and brutalizes three million of our fellow beings."

Discourse on Women 

In 1850, Mott published her speech Discourse on Woman, a pamphlet about restrictions on women in the United States.

American Equal Rights Association 

After the Civil War, Mott was elected the first president of the American Equal Rights Association, an organization that advocated universal suffrage. She resigned from the association in 1868 when Elizabeth Cady Stanton and Susan B. Anthony allied with a controversial businessman named George Francis Train. Mott tried to reconcile the two factions that split the following year over the priorities of woman suffrage and Black male suffrage. Ever the peacemaker, Mott tried to heal the breach between Stanton, Anthony and Lucy Stone over the immediate goal of the women's movement: suffrage for freedmen and all women, or suffrage for freedmen first?

Swarthmore College 
In 1864, Mott and several other Hicksite Quakers incorporated Swarthmore College in Swarthmore, Pennsylvania (near Philadelphia). It remains one of the premier liberal arts colleges in the country.

Pacifism 
Mott was a pacifist, and in the 1830s, she attended meetings of the New England Non-Resistance Society. She opposed the War with Mexico. After the Civil War, Mott increased her efforts to end war and violence, and she was a leading voice in the Universal Peace Union, founded in 1866.

Personal life 

On April 10, 1811, Lucretia Coffin married James Mott at Pine Street Meeting in Philadelphia. They had six children. Their second child, Thomas Mott, died at age two. Their surviving children all became active in the anti-slavery and other reform movements, following in their parents' paths. 

Mott died on November 11, 1880, of pneumonia at her home, Roadside, in the district now known as La Mott, Cheltenham, Pennsylvania. She was buried near to the highest point of Fair Hill Burial Ground, a Quaker cemetery in North Philadelphia.

Legacy 

Susan Jacoby writes, "When Mott died in 1880, she was widely judged by her contemporaries... as the greatest American woman of the nineteenth century." She was a mentor to Elizabeth Cady Stanton, who continued her work.

A version of the Equal Rights Amendment from 1923, which differs from the current text, was named the Lucretia Mott Amendment. That draft read, "Men and women shall have equal rights throughout the United States and every place subject to its jurisdiction. Congress shall have power to enforce this article by appropriate legislation."

The Camp Town section of Cheltenham Township, Pennsylvania, which was the site of Camp William Penn, and of Mott's home, Roadside, was renamed La Mott in her honor in 1885.

The United States Post Office issued a stamp in 1948 on the centennial of the Seneca Falls Convention, featuring Elizabeth Cady Stanton, Carrie Chapman Catt, and Lucretia Mott.

In 1983, Mott was inducted into the National Women's Hall of Fame.

Mott is commemorated along with Elizabeth Cady Stanton and Susan B. Anthony in Portrait Monument, a 1921 sculpture by Adelaide Johnson at the United States Capitol. Originally kept on display in the crypt of the US Capitol, the sculpture was moved to its current location and more prominently displayed in the rotunda in 1997.

The Lucretia Mott School in Washington D.C. was named for her, as was P.S. 215 Lucretia Mott, in Queens, New York City; the latter closed in 2015. The Lucretia Mott room at Friends House, London, UK is named after her. 

The U.S. Treasury Department announced in 2016 that an image of Mott will appear on the back of a newly designed $10 bill along with Sojourner Truth, Susan B. Anthony, Elizabeth Cady Stanton, Alice Paul and the 1913 Woman Suffrage Procession. Designs for new $5, $10 and $20 bills will be unveiled in 2020 in conjunction with the 100th anniversary of American women winning the right to vote via the Nineteenth Amendment.

See also 

 History of feminism
 Jane Johnson (slave)
 List of suffragists and suffragettes
 List of civil rights leaders
 Suffragette
 Women's Social and Political Union
 Women's suffrage in the United States

References

Citations

General and cited references

Further reading 
 
 
 
 
 
 
 
 Lucretia Coffin Mott, "Discourse on Woman", 1849 (From a book, Chapter 6, without pagination, continuous text), via Google Books

External links 

 Lucretia Mott, Women's Rights, National Historical Park, New York, National Park Service
 The Lucretia Mott Papers Project
 The Mott Manuscripts held at Friends Historical Library of Swarthmore College
 

1793 births
1880 deaths
19th-century American women writers
19th-century Quakers
American abolitionists
American anti-war activists
American Christian pacifists
American Quakers
American social reformers
American suffragists
Deaths from pneumonia in Pennsylvania
People from Cheltenham, Pennsylvania
People from Nantucket, Massachusetts
Political activists from Pennsylvania
Quaker abolitionists
Quaker feminists
Quaker ministers
Underground Railroad in Pennsylvania
University and college founders
Women civil rights activists